Tony Tubbs (born February 15, 1958) is an American former professional boxer who competed from 1980 to 2006, and held the WBA heavyweight title from 1985 to 1986.

Amateur career
As an amateur, Tony Tubbs competed in 253 bouts, compiling a record of 240 wins and 13 losses—primarily in the heavyweight division. In a 1976 match between the USSR and the United States, Tubbs lost by knockout in the second round to future Soviet Heavyweight Champion Igor Vysotsky.

In 1978 Tubbs lost in the quarterfinals of the world Cup to Cuban boxer Teofilo Stevenson. Tubbs was the only opponent who managed to go the distance with Stevenson. In 1979, Tubbs became the National AAU Heavyweight Champion by defeating Mitch Green and Greg Page, both contests were rematches of previous defeats. In the match-up meetings USSR versus the United States Tubbs defeated the two-time amateur European champion Yevgeni Gorstkov and the future silver medalist of the Olympic games Pyotr Zayev. In 1979 Tubbs won the AIBA Boxing World Cup, defeating Khoren Indzhyan, and finally avenged his loss to Marvis Frazier, who prior to that upset went unbeaten with a 42–0 (21 KOs) record.

By 1980 the conclusion of Tubbs' amateur career was the Olympic Games, but Tubbs was unable compete due to the US boycott of the 1980 Moscow Olympic Games. Among his other notable Amateur victories were defeating James Broad and Jimmy Clark, and 1980 Olympic bronze medalist Stephen Left. As an amateur, Tubbs worked as a sparring partner to Muhammad Ali, helping the former to prepare for his rematch with Leon Spinks for the World Heavyweight Championship.

Highlights

1976: USA–USSR Duals, Sahara Hotel Space Center, Las Vegas, Nevada (Heavyweight)
Lost to Igor Vysotsky (Soviet Union) RSC 2
1977: USA–USSR Duals, Milwaukee, Wisconsin (Heavyweight)
Defeated Pyotr Zayev (Soviet Union) by decision
1977: National Golden Gloves, Honolulu, Hawaii (Heavyweight)
1/2: Lost to Jimmy Clark by decision
1978: National Sports Festival, Fort Carson (Heavyweight)
Finals: Lost to Mitch Green by decision
1978: United States National Championships, Biloxi, Mississippi (Heavyweight)
1/2: Defeated Woody Clark by decision
Finals: Lost to Greg Page by decision
1978: World Championships, Belgrade, Yugoslavia (Heavyweight):
1/8: Defeated Istvan Levai (Hungary) by unanimous decision, 5–0
1/4: Lost to Teófilo Stevenson (Cuba) by unanimous decision, 0–5

1979: USA–USSR Duals, Las Vegas, Nevada (Heavyweight)
Defeated Yevgeniy Gorstkov (Soviet Union) by decision
 1979: National Golden Gloves (Heavyweight)
 (no data available)
 1979: United States National Championships, Lake Charles, Louisiana (Heavyweight)
Finals: Defeated Phillip Brown
1979: Frazier–Ali teams match-up, Atlantic City, New Jersey
Lost to Marvis Frazier by decision
 1979: World Cup, Madison Square Garden, New York City (Heavyweight):
1/4: Defeated Narciso Maldonado (Puerto Rico) KO 1
1/2: Defeated Luk Tchoula (Gabon) KO 3
Finals: Defeated Khoren Indzhyan (USSR) by unanimous decision, 5–0
1980: Frazier–Ali teams match-up, Houston, Texas (Heavyweight):
Defeated Marvis Frazier by decision

Tubbs finished his career having 253 fights, with a record of 240 wins, 13 losses.

Professional career

Early years
Tubbs made his professional debut on June 14, 1980, with a first-round knockout of Bruce Scott. After 11 fights, he fought fellow undefeated prospect Clarence Hill on August 7, 1982 and won by a ten-round unanimous decision. After out-pointing Jimmy Young (who had defeated George Foreman) on April 10, 1983, he was signed by Don King and began rising up the rankings while appearing on several King undercards. On March 15, 1985, he faced future WBA Heavyweight Champ James "Bonecrusher" Smith in a WBA title eliminator. Tubbs won by a unanimous decision, taking his record to 20-0 (15 knockouts).

World heavyweight title fights

On April 29, 1985, Tubbs challenged Greg Page for the WBA Heavyweight Championship. Page and Tubbs fought seven times as amateurs, with Page winning six of them, but for their only meeting as professionals, Tubbs won by a fifteen-round unanimous decision. On January 17, 1986, Tubbs made his first title defense against former WBC Heavyweight Champion Tim Witherspoon.

Tubbs and Witherspoon had a rematch scheduled for December 12, 1986, but Tubbs pulled out of the fight and was replaced by Bonecrusher Smith, who knocked Witherspoon out in the first round. Tubbs said he had an injured shoulder, but promoter Don King accused Tubbs of trying to get more money. On March 21, 1988, Tubbs challenged Mike Tyson for the Undisputed World Heavyweight Championship; after out-boxing Tyson in the first round, Tubbs was knocked out in the second.

On November 21, 1989, Tubbs out-pointed top contender Orlin Norris, winning the North American Boxing Federation title. However, Tubbs tested positive for cocaine. Tubbs was stripped of the title and the victory was changed to a "no contest".

On April 20, 1991, a 34-year-old Tubbs lost a controversial ten-round decision to future Undisputed World Heavyweight Champion, Riddick Bowe. The general consensus in the media was that Tubbs had easily outboxed Bowe. On August 8, 1992, Tubbs was upset by Lionel Butler in a first-round knockout. Tubbs came back to out-point future WBA Heavyweight Champion Bruce Seldon, knocking him down in the 1st round, and the undefeated Alexander Zolkin, but then suffered another first-round knockout—this one to clubfighter Jimmy Ellis.

People's Choice Heavyweight Tournament
In December 1993, Tubbs took part in the one-night People's Choice Heavyweight Tournament in Bay Saint Louis, Mississippi. He knocked out Willie Jackson in the first round and won three-round decisions over 1984 Olympic Gold Medalist Tyrell Biggs, Jose Ribalta, and Daniel Dăncuţă to win the tournament. Depending on pay-per-view revenue, he had a chance to win $1 million. He was paid $170,000.

Late career
From 1994 to 1997, Tubbs went 3–3 with one no-contest. He retired but came back in 2002. He lost two of his first three comeback fights, but then won his next five, including a win over 18-0 Brian Minto. His last fight was a six-round unanimous decision over clubfighter Adam Smith on November 4, 2006.

California Boxing Hall of Fame
Tubbs was inducted into the California Boxing Hall of Fame on June 25, 2011 in Studio City, CA. Tubbs attended the induction with his family, mother and children.

Professional boxing record

f

References

Sources
Toledo Blade February 3, 1980
The Pittsburgh Press April 7, 1983
Gettysburg Times April 30, 1985
Philadelphia Inquirer January 18, 1986
Daily News December 5, 1986
Los Angeles Times March 22, 1988
Sports Illustrated March 29, 1988
New York Times July 22, 1992
Philadelphia Inquirer December 8, 1993

External links

BoxingRecords

1958 births
World heavyweight boxing champions
World Boxing Association champions
Winners of the United States Championship for amateur boxers
Boxers from Cincinnati
Living people
American male boxers
African-American boxers
21st-century African-American people
20th-century African-American sportspeople